Thomas Lennon (born 24 September 1966) is an Irish retired hurler who played for Kilkenny Championship club Bennettsbridge. He played for the Kilkenny senior hurling team for a brief period, during which time he usually lined out as a right corner-forward.

Honours

Kilkenny
Leinster Senior Hurling Championship (1): 1987

References

1966 births
Living people
Bennettsbridge hurlers
Kilkenny inter-county hurlers